The Twenty-Ninth Legislature of the Territory of Hawaii was a session of the Hawaii Territorial Legislature.  The session convened in Honolulu, Hawaii, and ran from February 20 until May 7, 1957. This was the final session which comprised 15 senators and 30 representatives.

Legislative session
The session ran from February 20 until May 7, 1957. It passed 322 bills into law.

Senators

House of Representatives

References

Hawaii legislative sessions